The 2022 Grand Prix Cycliste de Marseille La Marseillaise was the 43rd edition of the Grand Prix La Marseillaise one-day road cycling race. It was held on 30 January 2022 as a category 1.1 race on the 2022 UCI Europe Tour, and as the first event of the 2022 French Road Cycling Cup.

In the finishing sprint, Amaury Capiot took his first professional victory, sprinting out of the slipstream of Mads Pedersen, who held on for second. Edvald Boasson Hagen, who had been one of the first to start his sprint, was passed by Kiko Galván for third, but managed to hold off fast-finishing Benoît Cosnefroy, winner of the 2020 edition, for fourth.

Teams 
Nine of the 18 UCI WorldTeams, eight UCI ProTeams, and four UCI Continental teams made up the 21 teams that participated in the race. All but three of these teams entered a full squad of seven riders.  and  each entered six riders, while  entered five.  had originally entered six riders as well, but Sylvain Moniquet was forced to withdraw due to a positive COVID-19 test result days before the race.  was reduced to six riders with one non-starter, while  was reduced to five riders with two non-starters. In total, 140 riders started the race, of which 130 finished.

UCI WorldTeams

 
 
 
 
 
 
 
 
 

UCI ProTeams

 
 
 
 
 
 
 
 

UCI Continental Teams

Result

References 

Grand Prix La Marseillaise
Grand Prix La Marseillaise
2022
Grand Prix La Marseillaise